Cody Marshall Decker (born January 17, 1987) is an American former professional baseball player who played for the San Diego Padres of Major League Baseball (MLB). A right-handed power hitter, he played first base, third base, left field, and could catch.

Playing college baseball for UCLA, he led the Pac-10 in home runs with 21 during his senior year in 2009, was a two-time All-Pac-10 selection, and ended his college career tied for 7th on UCLA's all-time home run list with 47.

Decker was drafted by the San Diego Padres in the 22nd round of the 2009 Major League Baseball Draft. That summer he batted .354 and led the Arizona League (AZL) in home runs, RBIs (63-an AZL record), total bases (142-an AZL record), and slugging percentage (.717), and had the best fielding percentage for a first baseman.  He was named the AZL Most Valuable Player and a Topps Post-Season All Star. In 2010, he was fourth in the California League in home runs (28) and seventh in RBIs (90). He was named an MiLB.com San Diego Organization All Star and MiLB.com Short-Season Best Hitter of the Year. In 2012, he was second in the Texas League in home runs (25) and third in slugging percentage (.540). That fall he played for the Israel national baseball team in the qualifying rounds of the 2013 World Baseball Classic. In 2014, Decker tied for fourth in the Pacific Coast League (PCL) in home runs (27), led all Padres minor leaguers in homers, and tied for third among Padres minor leaguers in RBIs (79). He was named a 2014 MiLB.com San Diego Organization All Star. In 2015, he was a PCL mid-season All Star, and an MiLB.com San Diego Organization All Star.

Decker made his Major League debut on September 14, 2015, after 2,566 at bats in 761 games over seven seasons in the minor leagues. At the time, his 154 home runs in the minors were the most by any MLB-affiliated minor league player since he was drafted in 2009. He played for Team Israel at the 2017 World Baseball Classic.

Early life
Decker was born in Santa Monica, California, and is Jewish. His parents are Jay and Terri Decker, and he has an older brother (Jesse) and an older sister (Jenifer).

He attended Santa Monica High School in Santa Monica, California. There, playing first base, third base, and catcher he batted .490 over three seasons, and was a three-time All Bay League pick. In 2005, Decker was Ocean League MVP, Division IV Southern Section All-CIF first-team, and named to the Los Angeles Times All-South Bay/Westside Region team.

College
Decker then attended the University of California, Los Angeles (UCLA) on a baseball scholarship, where he majored in History, minored in Film, and was a designated hitter, first baseman, and left fielder for the UCLA Bruins baseball team. In his sophomore year in 2007, he was 3rd in the Pac-10 in home runs with 14.  He led the Pac-10 in home runs with 21 during his senior year in 2009, and was 3rd in walks (46), 5th in runs (55), and 6th in RBIs (53). Decker was the first hitter since Eric Byrnes to hit at least five homers in each of his four college seasons, and ended his college career tied with Ryan McGuire for 7th on UCLA's all-time home run list with 47.  He was a two-time All-Pac-10 selection, in 2007 and 2009.

Professional career

San Diego Padres
The San Diego Padres selected Decker in the 22nd round of the 2009 Major League Baseball draft. He said his after-tax signing bonus was $638.

In 2009, Decker batted .354 (3rd in the league) and led the Arizona League in home runs (15), RBIs (63-an Arizona League record), doubles (21), extra-base hits (39), total bases (142-an Arizona League record), slugging percentage (.717), and OPS (1.138), was 2nd in hits (70), 4th in runs (46) and on base percentage (.421), and had the best fielding percentage for a first baseman, while playing for the Arizona League Padres.  Decker was named the AZL Most Valuable Player (beating out Mike Trout), a Topps Short-Season/Rookie All Star, and Topps Post-Season All Star.

In 2010, Decker was fourth in the California League in home runs (28; tied for the lead among Padres minor leaguers), sixth in doubles (35), seventh in RBIs (90; second-best among Padres minor leaguers), and ninth in walks (60), with the High-A Lake Elsinore Storm. He then was named an MiLB.com San Diego Organization All Star and MiLB.com Short-Season Best Hitter of the Year with the Arizona League Padres, and voted California League Player of the Week on August 30, 2010, with the Storm.

Decker missed nearly three months of the 2011 season with a severe third-degree right ankle sprain, though he hit 15 home runs in 59 games, 13 of them in AA.

In 2012, Decker finished second in the Texas League in home runs (25), third in slugging percentage (.540), and tenth in RBIs (68) with the AA San Antonio Missions.  In addition, he was twice named Texas League Player of the Week, on May 7 and May 14.

Decker split the 2013 season between San Antonio and Tucson, hitting 19 home runs (second among Padres minor leaguers) with 70 RBIs. He was third in the Pacific Coast League in slugging percentage (.534).

In 2014, Decker tied for fourth in the Pacific Coast League (PCL) in home runs with 27 for the AAA El Paso Chihuahuas, and led all Padres minor leaguers in homers. He also tied for third among Padres minor leaguers in RBIs, with 79. He was named a 2014 MiLB.com San Diego Organization All Star.

In 2015, he was a PCL mid-season All Star with El Paso, and an MiLB.com San Diego Organization All Star. Decker had the fourth-best home run/at bat ratio in the league, with a homer every 17.78 at bats. On May 11, 2015, he was voted PCL Player of the Week. Through 2015, he was the all-time minor league home run leader for the Padres, with 154. Sam Geaney, the Padres Director of Player Development, described him as "big-time right-handed power." Afterwards, newspaper El Paso Times called him "the most popular player during the El Paso Chihuahuas' first two seasons."  Announcer Tim Hagerty said he had not ever seen a ballplayer connect with a team's fan base as Decker did with El Paso.

Decker made his Major League debut with the Padres on September 14, 2015, after 2,566 at bats in 761 games over seven seasons while playing in the minor leagues. At the time, his 154 home runs in the minors were the most by any MLB-affiliated minor league player since he was drafted in 2009, and the most ever by a Padres minor leaguer. Decker went hitless with an RBI in 11 at bats, and became a free agent after his debut season.

Royals/Rockies/Red Sox
Decker signed with the Kansas City Royals on December 3, 2015. They traded him to the Colorado Rockies on April 20, 2016, who released him on May 17, 2016. On June 13, 2016, Decker signed a minor league deal with the Boston Red Sox, who assigned him to the Portland Sea Dogs in the AA Eastern League.

Milwaukee Brewers
In January 2017, Decker signed a minor league contract with the Milwaukee Brewers. Decker was to convert full-time to catcher. Decker had been managed by Pat Murphy, the Brewers bench coach, when both of them were in the San Diego Padres system. The Brewers released him on March 27.

New York Mets
In April 2017, the New York Mets signed Decker to a minor league deal.  He was the leading active career minor league home run hitter at the time, with 173. He initially played for the Binghamton Rumble Ponies, of the Class AA Eastern League, for whom he batted .257/.351/.522 with 7 home runs and 24 RBIs in 113 at bats. In June, he was promoted to the Las Vegas 51s of the Class AAA Pacific Coast League, for whom he batted .238/.304/.460 with 8 home runs and 21 RBIs in 126 at bats.

Arizona Diamondbacks
Decker signed a minor league contract with the Arizona Diamondbacks on February 1, 2018. He spent nearly the entire season playing for the Reno Aces in the Pacific Coast League, batting .268/.363/.516, with 9 home runs and 28 RBIs in 153 at bats. He finished the season with 197 career home runs in the minor leagues.

In October 2018, the Diamondbacks re-signed Decker and again assigned him to the Reno Aces. In 2019 for Reno he batted .240/.348/.521, with seven home runs and 21 RBIs in 96 at bats.

Retirement
On July 7, 2019, Decker announced the end of his playing career.

Team Israel
In 2012, by virtue of his Jewish heritage, Decker played for the Israel national baseball team in the qualifying rounds of the 2013 World Baseball Classic. He was 1-10 in three games, and had two RBIs. During the opening game, Decker was the starting left fielder and batted fourth, going 0-for-4 with a strikeout. During the second game, Decker again started in left field while batting clean up, going 0-for-4 with a strikeout. In the third and final game Decker went 1-for-2 with two walks (one intentional), two RBIs and a strikeout.

Decker played for Israel at the 2017 World Baseball Classic qualifier. Decker was the starting third baseman during all three of Israel's games, batted fifth. During the opening game Decker went 1-for-3 with a double, an RBI on a sacrifice fly, and a run scored, with one strikeout, before being replaced defensively by Mitch Glasser. Against Brazil in the second game, Decker with 1-for-2, while picking up the game's only RBI on a sacrifice fly, before again being replaced defensively by Glasser. During the third and final game of the qualifier, Decker went 1-for-3, with a solo home run and a walk.

Decker played for Team Israel at the 2017 World Baseball Classic main tournament, in March 2017.

Decker brought the team's mascot with him to Asia from the United States for the WBC. The mascot is "Mensch on the Bench", a five-foot-tall plush stuffed toy that looks a bit like a rabbi or Hasidic Jew with a long beard and mustache who is wearing a tallis and holding a candle. "Mensch", in Yiddish, means a person of integrity or honor. Decker said he "tried getting him a first-class ticket. But that didn’t fly, so he was put in a duffel bag and checked." The mascot proved to be a big hit, and the team took him everywhere. The mascot had his own locker, sat on Team Israel's bench in the dugout during every game, and sat alongside Decker at a press conference in South Korea. Decker said: "He’s a mascot, he’s a friend, he’s a teammate, he’s a borderline deity to our team.... He brings a lot to the table....  Every team needs their Jobu. He was ours. He had his own locker, and we even gave him offerings:  Manischewitz, gelt, and gefilte fish... He is everywhere and nowhere all at once. His actual location is irrelevant because he exists in higher metaphysical planes. But he’s always near."

Accolades
Decker was inducted into the Southern California Jewish Sports Hall of Fame in 2020.

Personal life
Decker has earned his Screen Actors Guild card, and had a cameo in the NBC espionage thriller State of Affairs. He also produces his own short films on the side.

Decker is known for his pranks. In 2014, while playing with the El Paso Chihuahuas in AAA, for the first month of the season he convinced veteran outfielder Jeff Francoeur that their  teammate, pitcher Jorge Reyes, was deaf. Reyes cooperated with the prank, maintaining the appearance of being deaf by not speaking or listening to music. Decker filmed and produced a seven-minute  documentary, "On Jeff Ears," revealing the truth to Francoeur. The prank documentary went viral, getting over 1.5 million hits on YouTube.  Sportswriter Peter Gammons called Decker "My new favorite person."  Decker raises money for the deaf and for animal rescue through charitable events.

The San Diego Union-Tribune called him "One of the most colorful characters in professional baseball." Decker  is also known for having over 23,000 followers on Twitter.  In the off-season, he has worked as a bartender, a bouncer, and trivia night host. He has also appeared in several videos for the YouTube channel Screen Junkies, most notably the debate series Movie Fights.

On December 23, 2016, Decker became engaged to model and sports journalist Jenn Sterger, whom he met on Twitter. On January 19, 2018, Decker married Sterger.

See also
List of Jewish baseball players

References

External links

, or Retrosheet, or Pura Pelota (Venezuelan Winter League)

1987 births
2017 World Baseball Classic players
Living people
Albuquerque Isotopes players
Arizona League Padres players
Baseball players from Santa Monica, California
Binghamton Rumble Ponies players
Bravos de Margarita players
American expatriate baseball players in Venezuela
Charros de Jalisco players
El Paso Chihuahuas players
Fort Wayne TinCaps players
Jewish American baseball players
Jewish Major League Baseball players
Lake Elsinore Storm players
Las Vegas 51s players
Major League Baseball first basemen
Omaha Storm Chasers players
Portland Sea Dogs players
Reno Aces players
San Antonio Missions players
San Diego Padres players
Tomateros de Culiacán players
American expatriate baseball players in Mexico
Tucson Padres players
UCLA Bruins baseball players
21st-century American Jews
Duluth Huskies players
Mankato MoonDogs players